Local elections were held in Indonesia on 9 December 2015. Eligible voters went to the polls to determine 9 gubernatorial, 224 regent and 36 mayoral races across the country. This election marks the first time since Indonesia's transition to democracy that local elections are held simultaneously in one day. Under the current plan, simultaneous partial local elections will be held in February 2017, June 2018, December 2020, culminating in simultaneous elections for all local executive posts on 2024.

Schedule  
In the timetable organized by the General Elections Commission (KPU), independent candidates were to submit signatures for nominations between 8–12 June 2015 (for gubernatorial candidates) and between 11–15 June 2015 (for regent and mayoral candidates). The independents along with candidates with support from political parties in the respective local legislatures formally registered their candidacies between 26–28 July. The documents submitted were verified and the candidates undertook medical check-ups. The local electoral commissions (KPUD) announced the candidates that will contest the elections on 24 August.

Campaigning ran between 27 August and 5 December. No campaigning were allowed between 6–8 December (the eve of the election).

Polling stations opened in the morning on 9 December 2015 and closed in the afternoon.

Official results were announced between 21–23 December 2015.

Gubernatorial races 
Note: Incumbents denoted in italic is either term-limited or not running for re-election.

Regent races 
Note: Incumbents denoted in italic is either term-limited or not running for re-election.

Mayoral races 
Note: Incumbents denoted in italic is either term-limited or not running for re-election.

References 

 
2015 elections in Indonesia
2015
Indonesia politics-related lists
December 2015 events in Indonesia